Andreas Strüngmann (born 1950) is a German businessman who founded generic drug maker Hexal AG ($1.6 billion sales during 2004) in 1986. It became Germany's second-largest generic drug producer. In February 2005, he and his brother Thomas sold Hexal and their 67.7% of U.S. Eon Labs to Novartis for $7.5 billion, making its subsidiary Sandoz the largest generic-drug company in the world.

He currently has residences in Tegernsee and South Africa and is married with two children.  At age 56, he accepted an executive position at Sandoz, a generics division of Novartis.

See also
List of billionaires

References

External links
Forbes World's Richest People
Forbes Billionaires
Andreas Strungmann biography

Strungmann, Andreas
Strungmann, Andreas
German billionaires
20th-century German businesspeople
21st-century German businesspeople